Semele is a genus of molluscs of the family Semelidae described in 1817 by Heinrich Christian Friedrich Schumacher.

Species
 
 Semele amabilis (Reeve, 1853)
 Semele australis (G. B. Sowerby I, 1833)
 Semele barbarae (Boone, 1928)
Semele bellastriata (Conrad, 1837)
 Semele bicolor (C. B. Adams, 1852)
 Semele californica (Reeve, 1853)
 Semele capensis E. A. Smith, 1904
 Semele carnicolor (Hanley, 1845)
 Semele casali Doello-Jurado, 1949
 Semele casta (Reeve, 1853)
 Semele compta (Reeve, 1853)
 Semele cordiformis (Holten, 1802)
 Semele corrugata (G. B. Sowerby I, 1833)
 Semele craneana Hertlein & A. M. Strong, 1949
 Semele crenulata (Reeve, 1853)
 Semele decisa (Conrad, 1837)
 Semele duplicata (G. B. Sowerby I in Reeve, 1853)
 Semele elliptica (G. B. Sowerby I, 1833)
 Semele exarata (A. Adams & Reeve, 1850)
 Semele flavescens (Gould, 1851)
 Semele formosa (G. B. Sowerby I, 1833)
 Semele gruneri (Reeve, 1853)
 Semele hanleyi Angas, 1879
 Semele hedlandi M. Huber, 2010
 Semele iscovichorum Valentich-Scott, Coan & Zelaya, 2020
 Semele jamesi Coan, 1988
 Semele jovis (Reeve, 1853)
 Semele jucunda (Reeve, 1853)
 Semele laevis (G. B. Sowerby I, 1833)
 Semele lamellosa (G. B. Sowerby I in Reeve, 1853)
 Semele lamyi Nicklès, 1955
 Semele lenticularis (G. B. Sowerby I, 1833)
 Semele martinii (Reeve, 1853)
 Semele modesta (Reeve, 1853)
 Semele natalensis M. Huber, 2010
 † Semele neuvillei Cossmann & Peyrot, 1909 
 Semele pallida (G. B. Sowerby I, 1833)
 Semele phryne Angas, 1879
 Semele pilsbryi Olsson, 1961
Semele proficua (Pulteney, 1799)
Semele pulchra (G. B. Sowerby I, 1832)
Semele purpurascens (Gmelin, 1791)
 Semele radiata (Say, 1826)
 Semele rosea (G. B. Sowerby I, 1833)
Semele rubropicta Dall, 1871
Semele rupicola Dall, 1915
 Semele rupium (G. B. Sowerby I, 1833)
 Semele scabra (Hanley, 1843)
 Semele solida (J. E. Gray, 1828)
 Semele sowerbyi Tryon, 1869
 Semele tortuosa (C. B. Adams, 1852)
 Semele trindadis Simone, 2021
Semele venusta (Reeve, 1853)
 Semele verrucosa Mörch, 1860
 Semele vestalis (A. Adams in Reeve, 1853)
 Semele zalosa Chesney & P. G. Oliver, 1994
 Semele zebuensis (Hanley, 1843)

Synonyms
 Semele ada A. Adams & Angas, 1864: synonym of Myrtea ada (A. Adams & Angas, 1864) (original combination)
 Semele alveata Gould, 1861: synonym of Semele carnicolor (Hanley, 1845)
 Semele amoena (Reeve, 1853): synonym of Semele proficua (Pulteney, 1799)
 Semele aphrodite Angas, 1879: synonym of Semele cordiformis (Holten, 1802)
 Semele ashleyi Hertlein & Grant, 1972: synonym of Semele rubropicta Dall, 1871
 Semele aspasia Angas, 1879: synonym of Semele carnicolor (Hanley, 1845)
 Semele aurora Tursch & Pierret, 1964: synonym of Semele martinii (Reeve, 1853)
 Semele brambleyae Powell, 1967: synonym of Semele vestalis (A. Adams in Reeve, 1853) (Single New Zealand specimen presumably introduced)
 Semele braziliensis E. A. Smith, 1885: synonym of Abra braziliensis (E. A. Smith, 1885) (original combination)
 Semele carolinensis Conrad, 1867: synonym of Semele proficua (Pulteney, 1799)
 Semele clydosa Bernard, 1983: synonym of Semele sowerbyi Tryon, 1869
 Semele crenata A. Adams & Angas, 1864: synonym of Semele crenulata (Reeve, 1853) (junior synonym)
 Semele duplicata Gould, 1861: synonym of Semele zebuensis (Hanley, 1843)
 Semele exigua H. Adams, 1862: synonym of Abra exigua (H. Adams, 1862) (original combination)
 Semele fazisa Gregorio, 1884: synonym of Semele striata (Reeve, 1853): synonym of Cumingia deshayesiana Vaillant, 1865
 Semele floreanensis Soot-Ryen, 1932: synonym of Semele rupium (G. B. Sowerby I, 1833)
 Semele fucata Mörch, 1861: synonym of Semele bicolor (C. B. Adams, 1852)
 Semele gouldi Tryon, 1869: synonym of Semele zebuensis (Hanley, 1843)
 Semele gratiosa Reeve, 1853: synonym of Semele zebuensis (Hanley, 1843) (introduced in synonymy)
 Semele guaymasensis Pilsbry & H. N. Lowe, 1932: synonym of Semele hanleyi Angas, 1879
 Semele hertleini Durham, 1950: synonym of Semele verrucosa Mörch, 1860
 Semele incongrua Carpenter, 1864: synonym of Semele venusta (Reeve, 1853)
 Semele infans E. A. Smith, 1885: synonym of Abra infans (E. A. Smith, 1885) (original combination)
 Semele jaramija Pilsbry & Olsson, 1941: synonym of Semele verrucosa Mörch, 1860
 Semele junonia Verrill, 1870: synonym of Semele rosea (G. B. Sowerby I, 1833)
 Semele lata Bush, 1885: synonym of Semele bellastriata (Conrad, 1837)
 † Semele leana Dall, 1900: synonym of Semele rosea (G. B. Sowerby I, 1833)
 Semele macandreae H. Adams, 1870: synonym of Semele striata (Reeve, 1853): synonym of Cumingia deshayesiana Vaillant, 1865
 Semele margarita Olsson, 1961: synonym of Semele verrucosa Mörch, 1860
 Semele mediamericana Pilsbry & H. N. Lowe, 1932: synonym of Semele proficua (Pulteney, 1799)
 Semele modesta A. Adams, 1854: synonym of Semele modesta (Reeve, 1853)
 Semele monilis Tate, 1891: synonym of Semele jucunda (Reeve, 1853)
 Semele nexilis Gould, 1862: synonym of Semele bellastriata (Conrad, 1837)
 Semele nitida (O. F. Müller, 1776): synonym of Abra nitida (O. F. Müller, 1776)
 Semele nuculoidea: synonym of Semelina nuculoides (Conrad in Hodge, 1841) (misspelling)
 Semele obliqua (Wood, 1815): synonym of Semele purpurascens (Gmelin, 1791)
 Semele ornata Gould, 1862: synonym of Semele purpurascens (Gmelin, 1791)
 Semele pacifica Dall, 1915: synonym of Semele verrucosa Mörch, 1860
 Semele paziana Hertlein & A. M. Strong, 1949: synonym of Semele pallida (G. B. Sowerby I, 1833)
 Semele philippinensis E. A. Smith, 1885: synonym of Abra philippinensis (E. A. Smith, 1885) (original combination)
 Semele piperata (Poiret, 1789): synonym of Scrobicularia plana (da Costa, 1778)
 Semele planata Carpenter, 1856: synonym of Semele tortuosa (C. B. Adams, 1852)
 Semele profundorum E. A. Smith, 1885: synonym of Abra profundorum (E. A. Smith, 1885)
 Semele purpurascens (Gmelin, 1791) sensu Nicklès, 1950: synonym of Semele lamyi Nicklès, 1955
 Semele quentinensis Dall, 1921: synonym of Semele pulchra (G. B. Sowerby I, 1833)
 Semele radiata (Reeve, 1853): synonym of Semele cordiformis (Holten, 1802) (junior homonym)
 Semele regularis Dall, 1915: synonym of Semele pallida (G. B. Sowerby I, 1833) (invalid: junior homonym of Semele regularis E.A. Smith, 1885; S. paziana is a replacement name)
 Semele regularis E. A. Smith, 1885: synonym of Abra regularis (E. A. Smith, 1885) (original combination)
 Semele reticulata Schumacher, 1817: synonym of Semele proficua (Pulteney, 1799)
 Semele rubrotincta Carpenter, 1857: synonym of Semele decisa (Conrad, 1837)
 Semele scabra (Hanley, 1843) sensu Bosch & Bosch, 1982: synonym of Semele zalosa Chesney & P. G. Oliver, 1994 (misapplication)
 Semele shoplandi Melvill, 1898: synonym of Semele cordiformis (Holten, 1802)
 Semele simplicissima Pilsbry & H. N. Lowe, 1932: synonym of Semele pallida (G. B. Sowerby I, 1833)
 Semele sinensis A. Adams, 1854: synonym of Semele cordiformis (Holten, 1802)
 Semele sowerbyi Lamy, 1912: synonym of Semele barbarae (Boone, 1928) (invalid: junior homonym of Semele sowerbyi Tryon, 1869)
 Semele sparsilineata Dall, 1915: synonym of Semele purpurascens (Gmelin, 1791)
 Semele striata (Reeve, 1853): synonym of Cumingia deshayesiana Vaillant, 1865
 Semele tabogensis Pilsbry & H. N. Lowe, 1932: synonym of Semele rosea (G. B. Sowerby I, 1833)
 Semele tita Dall, Bartsch & Rehder, 1938: synonym of Semele australis (G. B. Sowerby I, 1833)
 Semele uruguayensis Pilsbry, 1897: synonym of Abra uruguayensis (Pilsbry, 1897)
 Semele verruculastra Keen, 1966: synonym of Semele formosa (G. B. Sowerby I, 1833)
 Semele virginiana Meyer, 1888: synonym of Semelina nuculoides (Conrad in Hodge, 1841)
 Semele warburtoni Tenison Woods, 1877: synonym of Codakia orbicularis (Linnaeus, 1758) (junior synonym)

References

 Coan, E. V.; Valentich-Scott, P. (2012). Bivalve seashells of tropical West America. Marine bivalve mollusks from Baja California to northern Peru. 2 vols, 1258 pp.

External links
 Schumacher C.F. (1817). Essai d'un nouveau système des habitations des vers testacés. Schultz, Copenghagen. iv + 288 pp., 22 pls
 Lamarck, J.B. (1818). [volume 5 of] Histoire naturelle des Animaux sans Vertèbres, préséntant les caractères généraux et particuliers de ces animaux, leur distribution, leurs classes, leurs familles, leurs genres, et la citation des principales espèces qui s'y rapportent; precedes d'une Introduction offrant la determination des caracteres essentiels de l'Animal, sa distinction du vegetal et desautres corps naturels, enfin, l'Exposition des Principes fondamentaux de la Zoologie. Paris, Deterville. vol 5: 612 pp.
 de Gregorio, A. (1884-1885). Studi su talune conchiglie mediterranee viventi e fossili con una rivista del genere Vulsella. Bullettino della Società Malacologica Italiana. 10: 36-128

Semelidae
Bivalve genera